Al-Safiriyya was a Palestinian Arab village in the Jaffa Subdistrict. It was depopulated during Operation Hametz in the 1948 Palestine War on May 20, 1948. It was located 11 km east of Jaffa,  1.5 km west of Ben Gurion Airport.

Starting in 1949, the ruins of the site were overbuilt by the Israeli town of Kfar Chabad.

History
Khirbat Subtara is one of the notable khirbat in the area.

al-Safiriyya was known to the  Byzantines and Crusaders as Sapharea or Saphyria.

Hani Al-Kindi, an early   Muslim scholar and acetic, was buried in Al-Safiriyya.  The Umayyad caliph  Umar ibn Abd al-Aziz  (717– 720) had offered him the Governorship of Palestine, but  Al-Kindi had declined it.

Ottoman  era
Al-Safiriyya  was incorporated into the Ottoman Empire in 1517 with all of Palestine, and in 1596 it appeared in the  tax registers under the name of  Safiriyya, as being in the  nahiya ("subdistrict") of Ramla, which was under the administration of the liwa ("district") of Gaza. It had a population of 53 household; an estimated 292 persons,  who were all Muslims. They paid a fixed tax-rate of 33,3 % on agricultural products, including wheat, barley,  summer crops,  sesame, vineyards, fruit trees,  goats and beehives, in addition to occasional revenues; a total of 18,800 akçe. All of the revenue went to a Waqf.

In 1838  Safiriyeh  was among the villages  Edward Robinson noted from the top of the White Mosque, Ramla. It was further noted as a Muslim village, in the Lydda  District.

In 1863 Victor Guérin found the village to have 450 inhabitants. He noted that the mosque was shaded by an old  mulberry  tree, and around the village  were  plantations of tobacco and watermelons.

An Ottoman village list from about 1870 showed that   es-Safirije had 29 houses and a population of 134, though the population count included men only.

In 1882,  the PEF's Survey of Western Palestine  described it as an  adobe village,   with olives to the south.

British Mandate era

In the 1922 census of Palestine conducted by the British Mandate authorities, Safriyeh had a population of 1,306, all Muslims, increasing in the 1931 census to 2,040 inhabitants, still all Muslims, in 489 houses.

In the 1945 statistics  it had a population of 3,070 Muslims,  with 12,842 dunams of land. Of this, Arabs used  3,539  for growing citrus and banana, 3,708 for plantations and irrigable land, 3,032 for cereals, while 95 dunams were classified as built-up areas.

al-Safiriyya had two elementary schools, one for boys founded in 1920 which had an enrollment of 348 boys in 1945, and another school was for girls, founded in 1945 with 45 girls.

1948, aftermath
Benny Morris gives both date and time of depopulation as unknown. Aref al-Aref writes that Al-Safiriyya was occupied by the Yishuv in April, 1948, at the same time as Yazur and  Bayt Dajan.

On September 13, 1948,  Al-Safiriyya was one of 14 Palestinian villages that  Ben-Gurion asked to be destroyed, in order to block the return of the villagers.

Tzafria, Kfar Chabad, Tochelet,  Ahi'ezer and the suburbs of Rishon LeZion today occupy Al-Safiriyya land.

In 1992 the village site was described: "The two schools – long concrete structures with rectangular doorways and windows – still stand and have been refurbished. A number of houses, some made of adobe bricks and others of concrete, also remain and are aither deserted or inhabited by Jewish families. They are architecturally simple and have rectangular doors and windows; most of their roofs are flat. Cactuses and a variety of trees line an old village road, and the site is generally dotted by sycamore and cypress trees. Parts of the surrounding land are covered by construction but some parts are cultivated by Israelis."

References

Bibliography

External links
   Welcome To al-Safiriyya
 al-Safiriyya, Zochrot
Survey of Western Palestine, Map 13: IAA,  Wikimedia commons

Arab villages depopulated during the 1948 Arab–Israeli War
District of Jaffa